Star Sector Atlas 1: the Terran Sector is a 1981 role-playing game supplement for Space Opera published by Fantasy Games Unlimited.

Contents
Star Sector Atlas 1: the Terran Sector is FGU's first set of starsector maps and planetary descriptions for its Space Opera role-playing system.

Reception
William A. Barton reviewed Star Sector Atlas 1: the Terran Sector in The Space Gamer No. 45. Barton commented that "If you're a Space Opera player or GM, you'll probably find Star Sector Atlas 1: the Terran Sector an invaluable play aid. Even those who prefer other SF systems might find some useful items to adapt to their games as well."

References

Role-playing game supplements introduced in 1981
Space Opera supplements